Higby is a ghost town in Roane County, West Virginia.

The town's name is a corruption of nearby Higly Creek.

References 

Landforms of Roane County, West Virginia
Ghost towns in West Virginia